Quakers Hill High School (QHHS) is a school in the Quakers Hill area in New South Wales, Australia. The school was built in 1993.

House system 
The house system at Quakers Hill High School consists of 6 houses:
 Ravensworth (red) 
 Oberon (orange)
 Yallah (yellow)
 Gundagai (green)
 Bathurst (blue)
 Perisher (purple)

Musicals
Quakers Hill High School produces an annual cabaret or musical to showcase their students' talents. In 2010, the show was based on Gilbert and Sullivan’s The Mikado. It was a modernised adaptation to the original.

Previous productions include: Relationships: A Snapshot In Time, Grease, Back To The Eighties and Who The Heck is Shakespeare?.

QHHS's recent musical It Began with Eve was a musical put together with different pieces from different movies and musicals. It showcased women's accomplishments.

Notable alumni
Jacob Hansford, an Olympic swimmer for Australia
Kenrick Monk, an Olympic swimmer for Australia
Matthew Norman, convicted drug smuggler and member of the Bali nine

References

External links
School website

Public high schools in Sydney
Educational institutions established in 1993
1993 establishments in Australia